Dmytro Leonov (born 6 November 1988) is a professional Ukrainian football midfielder.

Leonov is the product of the UOR Simferopol School System. He spent all his career as a player in different clubs of the Ukrainian First League and the Ukrainian Second League.

References

External links
 
 

1988 births
Living people
People from Yevpatoria
Ukrainian footballers
Ukraine student international footballers
Ukraine youth international footballers
FC Yalos Yalta players
FC Krymteplytsia Molodizhne players
MFC Mykolaiv players
FC Dnister Ovidiopol players
FC Arsenal-Kyivshchyna Bila Tserkva players
FC Stal Alchevsk players
FC Oleksandriya players
FC Kolos Kovalivka players
FC Chornomorets Odesa players
Association football midfielders
Ukrainian Premier League players